Northiaden, also known as N-desmethyldosulepin, is the major active metabolite of the tricyclic antidepressant (TCA) dosulepin (dothiepin; Prothiaden).

References

Alpha-1 blockers
Amines
Antihistamines
Dibenzothiepines
H1 receptor antagonists
Human drug metabolites
Muscarinic antagonists
Serotonin receptor antagonists
Serotonin–norepinephrine reuptake inhibitors
Tricyclic antidepressants